This is a list of holidays in Saint Kitts and Nevis.

 January 1: New Year's Day 
 January 2: Carnival Day
 Good Friday
 Easter Monday
 May 1: Labour Day
 Whit Monday
 August 1: Emancipation Day, commemorates liberation of slaves in 1834.
 August 2: Culturama Day
 September 16: National Heroes' Day, There are currently five national heroes: Robert Llewellyn Bradshaw, Paul Southwell, Joseph Nathaniel France, Simeon Daniel, and Kennedy Simmonds.
 September 19: Independence Day, from the U.K. in 1983. 
 December 25: Christmas Day
 December 26: Boxing Day

References 

 
Saint Kitts and Nevis